SNW domain-containing protein 1 is a protein that in humans is encoded by the SNW1 gene.

Function 

This gene, a member of the SNW gene family, encodes a coactivator that enhances transcription from some Pol II promoters. This coactivator can bind to the ligand-binding domain of the vitamin D receptor and to retinoid receptors to enhance vitamin D-, retinoic acid-, estrogen-, and glucocorticoid-mediated gene expression. It can also function as a splicing factor by interacting with poly(A)-binding protein 2 to directly control the expression of muscle-specific genes at the transcriptional level. Finally, the protein may be involved in oncogenesis since it interacts with a region of SKI oncoproteins that is required for transforming activity.

Interactions 

SNW1 has been shown to interact with:

 CIR, 
 Calcitriol receptor, 
 Histone deacetylase 2, 
 Mothers against decapentaplegic homolog 2,
 Mothers against decapentaplegic homolog 3, 
 NOTCH1 
 Nuclear receptor co-repressor 2, 
 Nuclear receptor coactivator 1, 
 PABPN1, 
 RBPJ, 
 Retinoblastoma protein,  and
 SKI protein.

References

Further reading